Travis Lee Coleman (born January 4, 1980) is a former American football defensive back. He played college football at Hampton University. He was a member of the Chicago Bears, Berlin Thunder, Detroit Lions, Indianapolis Colts, Albany Conquest, Kansas City Brigade, Alabama Vipers, Orlando Predators and New Orleans VooDoo.

Early years and college career
Coleman attended Goldsboro High School in Goldsboro, North Carolina.

Coleman earned Second-team All-Mid-Eastern Athletic Conference as a strong safety for the Hampton Pirates. He recorded 147 tackles, 13 interceptions and 48 pass breakups over his four-year career.

Professional career
Coleman signed with the Chicago Bears on April 29, 2002. He was released by the Bears on September 1 and signed to the team's practice squad on September 3, 2002. He signed a three-year contract with the Bears on November 12, 2002. He was allocated to NFL Europe in February 2003, where he played for the Berlin Thunder. He was released by the Bears on June 10, 2003.

Coleman spent time with the Detroit Lions during the 2003 off-season. He was signed by the Indianapolis Colts on August 15, 2003. He was released by the Colts on August 31, 2003.

Coleman played for the Albany Conquest of the af2 from 2004 to 2005. He signed with the Kansas City Brigade on October 15, 2005. He was signed by the Alabama Vipers on December 17, 2009. Coleman signed with the Orlando Predators on October 7, 2010. He played for New Orleans VooDoo in 2014 after being traded from the Orlando Predators.

References

External links
Just Sports Stats

Living people
1980 births
Players of American football from North Carolina
American football defensive backs
African-American players of American football
Hampton Pirates football players
Chicago Bears players
Berlin Thunder players
Albany Conquest players
Kansas City Brigade players
Alabama Vipers players
Orlando Predators players
New Orleans VooDoo players
People from Goldsboro, North Carolina
21st-century African-American sportspeople
20th-century African-American people